Channi Anand is an Indian photographer and journalist. He was one of three photojournalists from Associated Press to win the Pulitzer Prize for Feature Photography in 2020 for his pictures of India's crackdown on Kashmir.

Works
He has covered India-Pakistan border violence,political developments, stories of displacement the Earthquake in South Asia  He is working at Associated Press from 2000.

Primary life
Channi Anand is a resident of Jammu Kashmir.

Journalism 
Channi Anand currently works as a reporter for the US news agency Associated Press.

Achievement
In August 2019, Anand won the most prestigious journalism award, along with two other photojournalists, Dar Yasin and Mukhtar Khan, for covering the unprecedented situation in Indian-administered Kashmir.
gano el premio Pulitzer de fotografia en el año 2020

References

External links 
 Channi Anand on twitter
 Channi Anand on facebook

Indian photojournalists
Pulitzer Prize for Feature Photography winners
Associated Press people
Living people
Year of birth missing (living people)
People from Jammu and Kashmir